The San Pedro Parks Wilderness is located in southern Rio Arriba County in northern New Mexico and part of the Santa Fe National Forest. The Wilderness's average elevation is over 10,000 ft. Conifer forests, interspaced with grassy meadows, called "parks," characterize the wilderness. San Pedro Parks Wilderness is primarily visited for hiking, camping, hunting, and fishing. The Continental Divide Trail passes through the Wilderness.

History

In 1931, San Pedro Parks was designated a "Primitive Area" by the U.S. Forest Service.  In 1965 it was accorded Wilderness status and protection.  U.S. Wilderness Areas do not allow motorized or mechanized vehicles, including bicycles. Camping and fishing are allowed with proper permit, but no roads, buildings, logging, or mining are permitted. Wilderness areas within National Forests and Bureau of Land Management areas allow hunting in season

Topography, flora, and fauna

San Pedro Parks Wilderness is located in the Nacimiento Mountains, the western finger of the southernmost Rocky Mountains. The nearest town is Cuba, New Mexico. Some of the hiking and horseback trails leading into the wilderness are steep but the heart of San Pedro Parks is a plateau, about five miles by six miles, at an elevation of 10,000 feet (3,100 m). Vegetation on the plateau consists of grassy meadows, called "parks," interspaced with forests of Engelmann spruce, other conifers, and Quaking Aspen. The plateau is laced with several small streams which support populations of Rio Grande cutthroat trout. San Pedro Peaks rises gently among the meadows to an elevation of  feet. Wildflowers of many species abound. The meadows consist primarily of bluegrass, oat grass, sedge, rush, and Rocky Mountain iris.

Snowfall is heavy in winter and snow cover can persist until early June. Many of the meadows are boggy from the heavy precipitation.

Animals found in San Pedro Parks are typical of the southern Rocky Mountains: mule deer, black bear. wild turkey, and, especially, elk.  A large herd of elk summers in the wilderness. In addition, as of 2004 730 head of cattle are permitted to graze inside San Pedro Parks.

Climate 
Part of the park has a humid continental climate of the warm-summer type (Köppen: Dfb) and higher areas a continental subarctic climate (Dfc) with short summers (using the 0 °C isoterm).

Recreation

About 100 miles of trails crisscross San Pedro Parks.  The most popular is Vacas Trail, 7.5 miles (12 km) long.  The trailhead is on Forest Road 70 and the trail leads north past San Gregorio Lake and continues to San Pedro Park, the largest meadow in the wilderness.  Vacas trail intersects many other trails.  About 8 miles (13 km) of the Continental Divide Trail passes through the northeastern part of the wilderness. Fishing for stocked rainbow and native Rio Grande cutthroat trout is popular in the San Gregorio Lake and several small streams. Cross country skiing and snowshoeing are popular sports during the winter. 
In the fall, hunters visit the wilderness, seeking elk, deer, bear, and grouse.

Vacas Trail/San Gregorio Trailhead 
Of all the trails in San Pedro Parks the Vacas trail is the most popular. Starting at the San Gregorio Trailhead, the Vacas trail is 10.69 miles to San Pedro Park, which is the largest "park" in the Santa Fe National Forest wilderness. The elevation at the San Gregorio Trailhead is approximately 9,000 ft, with the climb up to San Pedro Park being gradual. Along this trail there are several parks that appear as breaks from the primarily spruce vegetation.

References

Protected areas of Rio Arriba County, New Mexico
Wilderness areas of New Mexico
Santa Fe National Forest
Protected areas established in 1931
1931 establishments in New Mexico